The Shilluk (Shilluk: Chollo) are a major Luo Nilotic ethnic group of Southern Sudan, living on both banks of the river Nile, in the vicinity of the city of Malakal. Before the Second Sudanese Civil War the Shilluk also lived in a number of settlements on the northern bank of the Sobat River, close to where the Sobat joins the Nile.

The Shilluk are the third largest ethnic group of Southern Sudan, after   their neighbours the Dinka and Nuer.

Their language is called Dhøg Cøllø, dhøg being the Shilluk word for language and mouth. It belongs to the Luo branch of the Western Nilotic subfamily of the Nilotic languages.

History and culture 

The Shilluk and the Anuak are the closest related members of the Luo Nilotic groups, many of the words in the Shilluk language are made up of words from dha anywaa or the Anuak language. Historically, the Shilluk were led by a king Reth who is considered to be from the divine lineage of the culture hero Nyikang, and whose health is believed to affect that of the nation. Formerly, their society was fairly hierarchical, with castes of royals, nobles, commoners, and slaves. Like most Nilotic groups, cattle-raising formed a large part of their economy; however, agriculture and fishing were more significant than usual, and most were sedentary. The Shilluk people created the Shilluk Kingdom which existed in Southern Sudan since (1454 to Present).

Physique 
The Shilluk, along with the Dinka, have been described as some of the tallest people in the world. Dinka Ruweng males investigated by D. F. Roberts in 1953–54 were on average 181.3 cm (5 ft 11 1⁄2 in) tall, and Shilluk males averaged 182.6 cm (6 ft 0 in). Generally, the Nilotic people are characterized as having long legs, narrow bodies and short trunks, an adaptation to the hot climate of the Southern Sudan region.

However, male Shilluk refugees measured in 1995 in Southwestern Ethiopia were on average only 172.6 cm (5 ft 8 in) tall. As the study points out, Nilotic people "may attain greater height if privileged with favorable environmental conditions during early childhood and adolescence, allowing full expression of the genetic material." Before fleeing, these refugees were subject to privation as a consequence of the succession of civil wars in their country from 1955 to the present.

Religion 

Most Shilluk have converted to Christianity, while some still follow the traditional religion or a mixture of the two; small numbers have converted to Islam. The Shilluk pride themselves in being one of the first Nilotic groups to accept Christianity, the other being the Anuak people. The Episcopal Church of the Sudan which dates the event to the late 19th Century when the Church Mission Society first began to send missionaries.

Colonial policies and missionary movements have divided Shilluk into between the Catholic and Protestant denominations. The Catholic Church was historically assigned the western bank of the Nile and ran missions stations at Lul, Detwoc, Tonga and Yoynyang, while the American Inland Mission ran a mission station at Doleib Hill, located to the south of Malakal on the eastern side of the Nile, but situated on the Sobat river. The Shilluk were a minority in the SPLM faction for most of the Second Sudanese Civil War, their number peaking in the late 1980s and the pre-ceasefire fighting in 2004.

Violence 
During the summer of 2010, the Sudan People's Liberation Army (SPLA), in an attempt to disarm the tribe and stop a local Shilluk rebellion, burned a number of villages and killed an untold number of civilians in South Sudan's Shilluk Kingdom. Over 10,000 people were displaced in the midst of the rainy season and sent fleeing into the forest, often naked, without bedding, shelter or food, with many children dying from hunger and cold.

Violence has started again in April 2011 with a SPLA crackdown on rebel controlled regions. Shilluk and well as Nuba are the alleged victims.

Footnotes

References
  This section discusses number systems in Dhok-Chollo.

External links
 
 The Shilluk people, their language and folklore (1912) 
 The Gateway to Shilluk Community
 Library of Congress Photo of two Shilluk men, dated 1936
 Mayhem in Sudan's Shilluk Kingdom
 Shilluk, Dhocolo in South Sudan

Ethnic groups in South Sudan
Nilotic peoples